Roxana Geraldina Vega Torres (born 23 September 1998) is a Salvadoran footballer who plays as a goalkeeper for CD FAS and the El Salvador women's national team.

Club career
Vega has played for CD FAS in El Salvador.

International career
Vega capped for El Salvador at senior level during the 2018 CONCACAF Women's Championship qualification and the 2020 CONCACAF Women's Olympic Qualifying Championship qualification.

See also
List of El Salvador women's international footballers

References

External links

1998 births
Living people
Salvadoran women's footballers
Women's association football goalkeepers
El Salvador women's international footballers